Cave-In-Rock may refer to:
Cave-In-Rock, Illinois
Cave-in-Rock State Park